Helmut Losch (12 October 1947 – 10 January 2005) was a world class East German weightlifter from the 1970s.

Losch competed at the 1972 Summer Olympics and finished fourth in the heavyweight event. Four years later at the 1976 Summer Olympics he won the bronze medal in the super-heavyweight class.

Losch was born in Barth and died in Stralsund.

References

1947 births
2005 deaths
People from Barth, Germany
German male weightlifters
Olympic weightlifters of East Germany
Weightlifters at the 1972 Summer Olympics
Weightlifters at the 1976 Summer Olympics
Olympic bronze medalists for East Germany
Olympic medalists in weightlifting
Medalists at the 1976 Summer Olympics
Sportspeople from Mecklenburg-Western Pomerania